The 4th Jussi Awards ceremony, presented by Elokuvajournalistit ry, honored the best Finnish films released between August 1, 1946 and July 31, 1947 and took place on October 19, 1947 at Restaurant Fennia in Helsinki. The Jussi Awards were presented in seven different categories, including Best Director, Best Cinematography, Best Short Film, Best Actor, Best Actress, Best Supporting Actor, and Best Supporting Actress.

Awards

References

External links
  

Jussi Awards